Project Madurai (மதுரை தமிழ் இலக்கிய மின்தொகுப்புத் திட்டம்) is an open and voluntary initiative to publish free versions of ancient Tamil literature on the Internet.  Texts are published in both TSCII (Tamil Script Code for Information Interchange), since its launch in 1998 and Unicode formats from 2004. The project was led by Dr. K. Kalyanasundaram, Lausanne, Switzerland (Project Leader) and Dr. P. Kumar Mallikarjunan, Blacksburg, Va, USA (Dy. Project Leader).

Project Madurai is one among many projects those are currently active worldwide which attempt to put ancient literary works in electronic form.

The etexts are distributed in both HTML and PDF file formats

History 
The Madurai project was initially made with the Inaimadhi and Mayilai Tamil fonts. But since 1999, mobile phones have been produced and produced by the Tamil-language Tamil database (Tamil Script Code for Information Interchange -TSCII). Mobile phones are also distributed on web pages (webpages in html format), PDF format. Since 2003, the Unicode system has been released.

Tools Used
During this project eKalappai(e-plough) is the tool used to type Tamil letters using standard US-en 101 Key board.

Awards
In 2007 Project Madurai was awarded the Iyal Award from The Tamil Literary Garden for their contribution to Tamil Literature through Information Technology

References

External links
 

Tamil computing
Tamil-language literature
Tamil society